Margarita Simonovna Simonyan (born 6 April 1980) is a Russian journalist. She is the editor-in-chief of the Russian state-controlled media organisations RT (formerly Russia Today) and Rossiya Segodnya. 

In 2022, Simonyan was sanctioned by the European Union as "a central figure of the Russian Government propaganda" responsible for "actions and policies which undermine the territorial integrity, sovereignty and independence of Ukraine". In January 2023, Ukraine imposed sanctions on Margarita for her support of 2022 Russian invasion of Ukraine.

Early life, family and education
Simonyan was born in the southern Russian city of Krasnodar, into an Armenian family. Both her parents are descendants of Armenian refugees from the Ottoman Empire. Her father's family, originally from Trabzon, settled in Crimea during the Armenian genocide of 1915.

During World War II, they were deported by Stalin's NKVD to the Urals along with thousands of other Hamshen Armenians. Her father was born in Yekaterinburg (Sverdlovsk). Her mother was born in Sochi to an Armenian family that had fled the massacres of the Armenians by the Turks in the late 19th century. Her two grandfathers were World War II veterans. 

Her family owns a restaurant in the town of Moldovka in Adlersky City District, Sochi. Simonyan has stated that she is from a working-class family and decided at an early age that she wanted to become a journalist, first working for the local newspaper, and then for a local television station while studying journalism at Kuban State University.

She spent a year as an exchange student in Bristol, New Hampshire, in 1995.

Career
Simonyan, as a correspondent, covered the Second Chechen War, and also serious flooding of the Krasnodar region, for her local television station, receiving an award for "professional courage". In 2002, she became a regional correspondent for Russia's national Rossiya television channel and covered the 2004 Beslan school hostage crisis.
Simonyan, one of the first correspondents to arrive at the scene, witnessed the killing of 334 people, 186 of them children. She told an interviewer "It was the worst thing that ever happened to me," and that she 'cried frequently' while trying to write about it. She then moved to Moscow where she joined the Russian pool of Kremlin reporters.

She was the first vice-president of the Russian National Association of TV and Radio Broadcasters and a member of the Civic Chamber of the Russian Federation. In 2010, her first book, Heading to Moscow! was published.

In late 2012 and early 2013, she was nicknamed the "bobroedka" because she was about to eat a beaver.

In 2018, Simonyan wrote the script for The Crimean Bridge. Made with Love!, a film directed by her husband, Keosayan. The film attracted scathing reviews, and was even the lowest-rated film on several film review aggregators, with Simonyan's script widely panned. Russian opposition politician Alexey Navalny released a video in March 2020, alleging serious corruption during the production of the film, with state funds intended for film production being siphoned off to Simonyan's relatives.

Editor-in-chief of RT and Rossiya Segodnya

Simonyan was only 25 when appointed editor-in-chief of RT (then known as Russia Today) in 2005, but had been working in journalism since she was 18. She stated in a 2008 interview that "her age often leads people to make assumptions about how she got her job." Andrei Richter, the director of the Moscow Media Law and Policy Institute and a journalism professor at Moscow State University, suggests that she was "appointed because she is well-connected." She is a Kremlin loyalist who is close to President Vladimir Putin.

RT began broadcasting on 10 December 2005 with a staff of 300 journalists, including approximately 70 from outside Russia. Simonyan frequently addresses media questions about RT's journalistic and political stance. At its launch, Simonyan stated that RT's intent was to have a "professional format" like the BBC, CNN and Euronews that would "reflect Russia's opinion of the world" and present a "more balanced picture" of Russia. She told a reporter that the government would not dictate content and that "Censorship by government in this country is prohibited by the constitution." 

She later told The Moscow Times that RT started to grow once it became provocative and that controversy was vital to the station. She said that RT's task was not to polish Moscow's reputation. The station has however been criticised repeatedly in the West for perceived bias. Simonyan has been quoted as saying: "There is no objectivity – only approximations of the truth by as many different voices as possible".

She discussed her views with The Washington Times of RT's coverage of the 2008 South Ossetia war, where Russia backed South Ossetia against the country of Georgia. She stated that among English speaking channels, only RT was giving the South Ossetian side of the story.  She rejected the allegation of Will Dunbar, an RT correspondent who left after alleging RT was downplaying Russian bombing raids, and denied his claims of censorship. She stated that compared to some other stations, "We are not making a secret out of the fact that we are a Russian station, and, of course, we see the world from a Russian point of view. We are being much more honest in that sense."

On 31 December 2013, she was cross-appointed as the editor-in-chief of the new government owned news agency Rossiya Segodnya and serves as editor-in-chief of both organizations concurrently. In May 2016, after she was included in the sanctions list of Ukraine by President Petro Poroshenko, she was denied entry to Ukraine.

In April 2022, Simonyan proposed removing the article on the prohibition of censorship from the 1993 Russian Constitution. According to her, freedom of speech will lead to "the collapse" of Russia. She called for emulating the People's Republic of China, which is a "non-free but prosperous country".

Racist segment about Barack Obama
On 30 November 2020, Simonyan, as editor in chief of RT, defended a TV segment that was roundly criticized as racist, which contained Simonyan's partner, Tigran Keosayan, and an actress in blackface posing as former United States President Barack Obama. In the segment,  Keosayan, referring to Obama's book A Promised Land, asks: "Do you consider this book your achievement?", to which the actress in blackface replies: "Of course."

Keosayan then asks: "Because none of your relatives have written books?", after which the actress answers: "Because none of my relatives that came before me could write." Keosayan then states "you should have been a rap musician, not the president". Keosayan and Simonyan are co-writers for the show "International Sawmill", in which the segment aired. Simonyan defended the segment by referring to Keosayan's ethnic Armenian background.

2022 Russian invasion of Ukraine

In December 2021, Simonyan stated in a TV debate that the war in Donbas "is ongoing and if a small war can stop this butchery that's gone on for seven years perhaps it's a way out." In the early weeks of 2022, Simonyan rejected speculation that Russia was preparing for a full-scale invasion of Ukraine. However, in mid-February 2022, she stated that "Russia cannot but stop this war. What are we waiting for?" 

On 23 February 2022, Simonyan was included in the European Union sanctions list for promoting "a positive attitude to the annexation of Crimea and the actions of separatists in Donbas." She is barred from entering EU countries and any assets she owns in them are frozen.

After the Russian invasion of Ukraine began on 24 February 2022, Simonyan expressed support for the invasion, including posting a Tweet saying that "This is a standard parade rehearsal, It's just that this year we decided to hold the parade in Kyiv," and mocking speculation that she would be targeted with further sanctions. She opposed the 2022 anti-war protests in Russia, stating that "If you are ashamed of being Russian now, don't worry, you are not Russian." She claimed that "Nobody is fighting against Ukrainians! We're liberating Ukraine! No one is bombing peaceful Ukrainian cities!" 

On Your Own Truth, presented by Roman Babayan on NTV on 26 March, Simonyan made multiple unsupported assertions, including a claim that Ukrainian doctors have called for Russian prisoners to be castrated and Ukrainian "Nazis" are "prepared to pluck children's eyes out based on their ethnicity." She also claimed that Ukrainian forces were attacking children in Mariupol with banned cluster munition. On 26 March, she said that to her "horror," a "considerable portion of the Ukrainian people have turned out to be engulfed in the madness of nazism."

She said that Russia was at war with NATO. On 26 April, while discussing the possibility of World War III and nuclear war with Vladimir Solovyov on The Evening with Vladimir Solovyov, Simonyan said, "Personally, I think that the most realistic way is the way of World War III, based on knowing us and our leader Vladimir Vladimirovich Putin, knowing how everything works around here, it's impossible—there is no chance—that we will give up ... We're all going to die someday." Igor Albin, former Vice Governor of Saint Petersburg, wrote on his Telegram channel: "Crazy 'propagandists' will burn in hell. You don't scold your own in times of war, but you shouldn't be proud of them either. There will be no winners in a nuclear war!"

She suggested that Russia should "disable" Ukrainian nuclear power plants.

She asked Kazakh President Kassym-Jomart Tokayev about Kazakhstan's position on the"special military operation" in Ukraine. He replied that "we recognize neither Taiwan, nor Kosovo, nor South Ossetia and Abkhazia. In all likelihood, this principle will be applied to quasi-state entities, which, in our opinion, are Luhansk and Donetsk." Simonyan believes that the 2022 food crisis, partly caused by Russia's invasion of Ukraine, will force the West to lift sanctions.

Pointing to chaotic partial mobilization and reports of old, disabled or otherwise unfit men being drafted into the army, Simonyan complained why the "millions of security officers and guards" who are being used in Russia are not sent to the front. She also complained that some recruits were receiving inadequate equipment.

In January 2023 Ukraine imposed sanctions on Margarita Simonyan for promoting Russia during the 2022 Russian invasion of Ukraine.

Comments about Armenia
During the 2020 Armenian–Azerbaijani war, Simonyan accused the Armenian authorities of provoking Russia by arresting former-president Robert Kocharyan and refusing to recognize the annexation of Crimea. She suggested that the CSTO's response was appropriate given Armenia's "anti-Russian sentiment." The CSTO later stated: "The opinion of [Simonyan] is completely contrary to the official position of the CSTO Secretariat." Her words were widely criticized in Armenian society. 

She said, "Any Armenian who dares to criticize Russia should go and cut out his dirty tongue. They brought the national traitor Nikol Pashinyan to power, who created the prerequisite for war." Political commentator Sergey Parkhomenko also criticized her, saying that Simonyan is posing as "a powerful representative of the Armenian people, while not being such at all from any point of view."

In October 2022, Simonyan stated that she was banned by Armenian authorities from entering the country.

Personal life
Simonyan was formerly married to the journalist and producer Andrey Blagodyrenko, giving birth to the couple's daughter, Mariana, in August 2013. She is now married to Russian-Armenian film director, Tigran Keosayan, with whom she regularly collaborates. They have three children together. Simonyan is fluent in Russian and English. She stated in a 2012 interview that she regrets not knowing Armenian, but explained that it is because her family never spoke Armenian at home due to dialectal differences.

Awards and honors

:
 Medal "For Strengthening the Combat Commonwealth" (2005)
 Order of Friendship (2007)
 Gratitude of the President of the Russian Federation (2010)
 Order For Merit to the Fatherland, 4th class (2014)
 Order of Alexander Nevsky (2019)
:
  Movses Khorenatsi Medal (2010)
:
  Order of Friendship (2008)

See also

Mikhail Lesin
 Russian information war against Ukraine

References

External links

Margarita Simonyan biography, IBC (International Broadcasting Convention) website, accessed 20 September 2012.
 
 
 

1980 births
Living people
Russian nationalists
Russian propagandists
Russian conspiracy theorists
Anti-Ukrainian sentiment in Russia
Russian people of Armenian descent
People from Krasnodar
Kuban State University alumni
Russian journalists
Russian television presenters
Members of the Civic Chamber of the Russian Federation
United Russia politicians
Russian women journalists
Russian women television presenters
RT (TV network) people
RT (TV network)
Russian individuals subject to European Union sanctions
Russian expatriates in the United States
Recipients of the Order "For Merit to the Fatherland", 4th class
Recipients of the Order of Alexander Nevsky
Russian individuals subject to United Kingdom sanctions
Sanctioned due to Russo-Ukrainian War